Nudist Memories is a 1961 British naturist film. It was inspired by the success of Nudist Paradise and was a success at the box office.

See also
Nudity in film

References

External links
Nudist Memories at IMDb

British short films
Nudity in film
1960s English-language films